Marco Insam (born June 5, 1989) is an Italian professional ice hockey forward who is currently playing for Italian club, Ritten/Renon of the Alps Hockey League (AlpsHL). Insam competed in the 2012 IIHF World Championship as a member of the Italy men's national ice hockey team.

References

External links

1989 births
Living people
Ässät players
Bolzano HC players
Italian ice hockey forwards
Ladin people
HC Milano players
Niagara IceDogs players
Notre Dame Hounds players
Ritten Sport players
People from Sëlva
Sportspeople from Südtirol